The Aracanidae are a family of bony fishes related to the boxfishes. They are somewhat more primitive than the true boxfishes, but have a similar protective covering of thickened scale plates. They are found in the Indian Ocean and the west Pacific.

Fossil species 
The family is represented in the fossil record by the extinct genus Proaracana with the single species P. dubia known from the Middle Eocene of Italy.

References

 
Marine fish families
Tetraodontiformes